Val d'Arry is a commune in the department of Calvados, northwestern France. The municipality was established on 1 January 2017 by merger of the former communes of Noyers-Missy (the seat), Le Locheur and Tournay-sur-Odon.

Population

See also 
Communes of the Calvados department

References 

Communes of Calvados (department)